Dag Øistein Endsjø (born 11 November 1968 in Ann Arbor, Michigan) is a Norwegian professor of religious studies at the University of Oslo, Norway. He's been published in thirteen languages.

Career

Endsjø research focuses on the continuity between traditional Greek and early Christian beliefs, sexuality and religion, religion and human rights, and religion and popular culture. In his book Greek Resurrection Beliefs and the Success of Christianity (2009), he demonstrates how Christian resurrection beliefs also connect to ancient Greek beliefs in resurrection and physical immortality and may have contributed to the early success of Christianity in the Hellenistic Mediterranean. The book Primordial Landscapes, Incorruptible Bodies (2008) deals with the continuity of geography, asceticism, immortality between traditional Greek and early Christian worldviews.

Of his other books, Sex and Religion: Teachings and Taboos in the History of World Faiths has been published in twelve languages: Arabic, Bulgarian, Chinese, English, Italian, Macedonian, Norwegian, Polish, Portuguese, Serbian, Swedish, and Ukrainian, while The History of Immortality is published in Norwegian and Latvian.

Endsjø has published various texts on religion and human rights, religion and popular culture, and the cultural understanding of sexuality and space in ancient Greek religion. He writes on a variety of political and popularized subjects in Norwegian media.

As an expert on human rights, Endsjø also contributed to change the Norwegian equal rights legislation more in accordance with international human rights, as well as the national debate on equal rights into a general discussion of human rights.

Endsjø is also the designer of the coat of arms of Fjord Municipality in Møre og Romsdal. He participated in the Norwegian selection for the 1994 Eurovision Song Contest as a lyricist and as part of the band SubDiva.

Books
 Udødelighetens historie. Fra Jesus’ oppstandelse til zombier, antioksidanter og barn i ilden (History of immortality. From the resurrection of Jesus to zombies, antioxidants and children in the fire). . Oslo: Cappelen Damm 2016. Also published in Latvian.
 Sex and Religion: Teachings and Taboos in the History of World Faiths. London: Reaktion Books 2011. . This book is also published in Arabic, Bulgarian, Chinese, Italian, Macedonian, Norwegian, Polish, Portuguese, Serbian, Swedish and Ukrainian. 
 Det folk vil ha. Religion og populærkultur (What People Want. Religion and Popular Culture) (written together with Liv Ingeborg Lied). Oslo: Universitetsforlaget 2011.  
 Greek Resurrection Beliefs and the Success of Christianity. New York: Palgrave Macmillan 2009. .
 Primordial Landscapes, Incorruptible Bodies. New York: Peter Lang 2008. . 
 Naturlig sex. Seksualitet og kjønn i den kristne antikken (co-editor with Halvor Moxnes and Jostein Børtnes). Oslo: Gyldendal Akademisk 2002. 
 Lei av kjønn? Nær-kjønn-opplevelser og andre beretninger fra virkeligheten (co-editor with Helge Svare). Oslo: Cappelen Akademisk Forlag 2001.

Other publications (selection)
“The Other Way around? How Freedom of Religion May Protect LGBT Rights”. The International Journal of Human Rights 24:10, 2020: 1681–1700. 
 “Immortal Bodies, Before Christ. Bodily Continuity in Ancient Greece and 1 Corinthians”.  Journal for the Study of the New Testament, vol. 30, 2008: 417–36. 
“Lesbian, Gay, Bisexual and Transgender Rights and the Religious Relativism of Human Rights”. Human Rights Review, vol. 6:2, 2005: 102–10. 
“To Control Death. Sacrifice and Space in Classical Greece”. Religion, vol. 33/4, 2003: 323–340.
“To Lock up Eleusis. A Question of Liminal Space”. Numen, vol. 47, 2000: 351–86.
“Placing the Unplaceable. The Making of Apollonius’s Argonautic Geography”. Greek, Roman and Byzantine Studies, vol 38. 1997: 373–85.

References

1968 births
Religion academics
Living people